Gerald Evard (born 23 May 1948) is a Swiss former backstroke swimmer. He competed in three events at the 1968 Summer Olympics.

References

External links
 

1948 births
Living people
Swiss male backstroke swimmers
Olympic swimmers of Switzerland
Swimmers at the 1968 Summer Olympics
Sportspeople from the canton of Vaud
20th-century Swiss people